Roy Arne Lennart Andersson (born 31 March 1943) is a Swedish film director, best known for A Swedish Love Story (1970), About Endlessness (2019) and his "Living trilogy," which includes Songs from the Second Floor (2000), You, the Living (2007) and A Pigeon Sat on a Branch Reflecting on Existence (2014). Songs from the Second Floor, more than any other, cemented and exemplified his personal style – which is characterized by long takes, absurdist comedy, stiff caricaturing  of Swedish culture and grotesque. He has spent much of his professional life working on advertisement spots, directing over 400 commercials and two short films; directing six feature-length films in six decades. His 2014 film A Pigeon Sat on a Branch Reflecting on Existence won the Golden Lion award at 71st Venice International Film Festival, making Andersson the only Swedish director and the second Nordic director to win the award in the history of the festival, after Danish Carl Theodor Dreyer won in 1955. Andersson is considered one of the most important living European film directors, having four films officially submitted for the Academy Award for Best Foreign Language Film as Swedish entries.

Life and career

Early years
Andersson was born in Gothenburg, Sweden in 1943. A year after graduating from the Swedish Film Institute in 1969, he directed his first feature-length film, A Swedish Love Story.  The film, awarded four prizes the same year at the 20th Berlin International Film Festival, looked at the nature and nuance of young love and turned out to be a major critical and popular success for Andersson. Following this success, Andersson fell into a depression. As he didn't want to get stuck with the same style and expectations he cancelled what was going to be his next project, with the script half-way finished, and skipped a couple of other ideas for plots he had previously planned to realize. Eventually he directed the film Giliap which was released in 1975. The film was a financial and critical disaster, went wildly over budget, and suffered lengthy delays in post-production. Giliap went in a decidedly different direction from A Swedish Love Story – replacing crowd-pleasing joy and soft humour with dark comedy and unforgiving deadpan. After Giliap, Andersson took a 25-year break from film directing, focusing his efforts mainly on his commercial work.

Later years
In 1981 he established Studio 24, an independent film company and studio located in central Stockholm. Later, he directed a short-film commissioned by the Swedish National Board of Health and Welfare entitled Something Happened. Made in 1987, the short was meant to be played at schools all over Sweden as an educational film about AIDS, but was canceled when it was three-fourths complete because of its overly dark nature and controversial use of sources. The official explanation was that it was "too dark in its message," and it wasn't officially shown until 1993. His next short film, 1991's World of Glory, developed this style even further and was a critical success, winning both the Canal Plus Award and the Press Prize at the 1992 Clermont-Ferrand Short Film Festival. The film is on a top ten list of all-time best short films, set by the Clermont-Ferrand festival.

In March 1996, Andersson began filming Songs from the Second Floor, a film that was completed four years later in May 2000. After its premiere at the 2000 Cannes Film Festival the film also became an international critical success. It won the Jury Prize in Cannes and five Guldbagge Awards in Sweden for best film, direction, cinematography, screenplay and sound. The film was made up of forty-six long tableaux shots, marrying tough, bleak social criticism with his characteristic absurdist dead-pan and surrealism.

Roy Andersson continued his commercial work at Studio 24 and his next film You, the Living premiered at the 2007 Cannes Film Festival as part of the Un Certain Regard selection. The film won the Nordic Council Film Prize in 2008.

The Museum of Modern Art in New York City presented a retrospective of Andersson's work in September 2009.

He expressed his desire to make a new film that could be considered the third part in a trilogy together with his two latest films, and publicly stated that he was planning "a third enormous, deep and fantastic, humorous and tragic, philosophical, Dostoyevsky film." In an interview with Ignatiy Vishnevetsky, Andersson revealed that he would be shooting his next film in high-definition video, possibly using the Red One camera, and that it would represent a departure in style from his previous two films. The film, titled A Pigeon Sat on a Branch Reflecting on Existence
was released in 2014 and won the Golden Lion for Best Film in competition at the 71st Venice Film Festival.

The Museum of Arts and Design in New York City presented a retrospective of Andersson's work entitled It's Hard to Be Human: The Cinema of Roy Andersson in 2015.

Influences and favourite films 
In 2012, Andersson participated in the Sight & Sound film polls of that year. Held every ten years to select the greatest films of all time, contemporary directors were asked to select ten films of their choice. Andersson stated: "All the ten films are excellent and fascinating artistic expressions about what I would call mankind’s both raw and delightful existence. These movies make us wiser." He added "My absolute favourite is Bicycle Thieves, the most humanistic and political film in history. Viridiana is the most intelligent and Hiroshima mon amour is the most poetic." His choices are listed below, in alphabetical order:
 Amarcord (Italy, 1972)
 Andrei Rublev (Russia, 1966)
 Ashes and Diamonds (Poland, 1958)
 Barry Lyndon (United States, 1975)
 The Battle of Algiers (Italy, 1968)
 Bicycle Thieves (Italy, 1948)
 Hiroshima Mon Amour (France, 1959)
 Intolerance (United States, 1916)
 Rashomon (Japan, 1950)
 Viridiana (Mexico, 1961)

Awards and honors
2000: "Stig Dagerman Prize"
2000: Jury Prize from Cannes Film Festival for Songs from the Second Floor
2010: Lenin Award
2014: "Golden Lion for Best Film" for A Pigeon Sat on a Branch Reflecting on Existence (71st Venice International Film Festival)
2020: Lifetime Achievement Award (Odessa International Film Festival)

Filmography

Short films

Feature films

Commercials

Bibliography
 Lyckad nedfrysning av herr Moro (1992)
 Vår tids rädsla för allvar (1995)
 Fotografier 1960-2003 (2012)

Notes

External links

 
 Interview with Roy Andersson, N by Norwegian
 Interview with Roy Andersson, MUBI
Studio 24 & Roy Andersson Production – official website
 
 Retrospective Roy Andersson at the FILMFEST MÜNCHEN

1943 births
Living people
Swedish film directors
Writers from Gothenburg
Directors of Golden Lion winners
Litteris et Artibus recipients
Best Director Guldbagge Award winners
Best Screenplay Guldbagge Award winners
Producers who won the Best Film Guldbagge Award
Venice Best Director Silver Lion winners
Swedish screenwriters
Swedish male screenwriters